Huo Xingxin (born 19 January 1996) is a Chinese fencer. She competed in the women's foil event at the World Fencing Championships in 2015, 2017, 2018 and 2019.

In 2017, she won the gold medal in her event at the Asian Fencing Championships held in Hong Kong.

In 2018, she won the silver medal in the women's team foil event at the Asian Games held in Jakarta, Indonesia. She also won one of the bronze medals in the women's team foil event at the 2019 Asian Fencing Championships held in Chiba, Japan.

References

External links 
 

Living people
1996 births
Place of birth missing (living people)
Chinese female foil fencers
Chinese female fencers
Asian Games silver medalists for China
Asian Games medalists in fencing
Fencers at the 2018 Asian Games
Medalists at the 2018 Asian Games
Left-handed fencers
21st-century Chinese women